The 1997–98 NBA season was the 30th season for the Phoenix Suns in the National Basketball Association. In the off-season, the Suns acquired Antonio McDyess from the Denver Nuggets in a three-team trade, and signed free agents Clifford Robinson, and George McCloud. Danny Ainge returned for his first full season as the Suns head coach, as they won nine of their first eleven games, which included a 140–139 quadruple overtime road win over the Portland Trail Blazers on November 14, 1997. The Suns continued to play competitive basketball holding a 31–15 record at the All-Star break. At midseason, the team traded Cedric Ceballos to the Dallas Mavericks in exchange for three-point specialist Dennis Scott, as they posted a ten-game winning streak between March and April, winning eleven of their final twelve games of the season. The Suns posted a 56–26 record as members of the Pacific Division, finishing third in their division and fourth in the Western Conference. All home games were played in America West Arena.

The team's top scorer Rex Chapman, who averaged 15.9 points per game, was part of a Suns offense that included four other players averaging double-digits in points in McDyess, Robinson, Danny Manning and Jason Kidd. Kidd was the team's sole member to be selected as a member of the 1998 NBA All-Star Game, averaging 11.6 points, 6.2 rebounds, 9.1 assists and 2.0 steals per game. He also finished second in the league in assists. In addition, McDyess averaged 15.1 points, 7.6 rebounds and 1.7 blocks per game, while Robinson provided the team with 14.2 points and 5.1 rebounds per game. Manning averaged 13.5 points and 5.6 rebounds per game off the bench, and was named Sixth Man of the Year, but did not play in any of the Suns' playoff games due to a knee ligament. Kevin Johnson only played in just 50 games, starting in just 12 of them due to tendinitis in his right knee, as he averaged 9.5 points and 4.9 assists per game, while also off the bench, second-year guard Steve Nash contributed 9.1 points and 3.4 assists per game, and McCloud contributed 7.2 points per game.

The Suns would make their 10th consecutive playoff appearance. In the Western Conference First Round, they faced off against the 5th-seeded San Antonio Spurs, who were led by David Robinson, and Rookie of the Year, Tim Duncan. Despite having home-court advantage in the series, the Suns would lose to the Spurs, three games to one. 

Following the season, McDyess re-signed as a free agent with his former team, the Denver Nuggets, while Johnson retired after eleven seasons in the NBA, but would make a comeback late during the 1999–2000 season, Nash was traded to the Dallas Mavericks, Hot Rod Williams signed as a free agent with the Mavericks, Scott signed with the New York Knicks, and Mark Bryant was traded to the Chicago Bulls.

Offseason

NBA Draft

The Suns used their only draft pick to select future star Stephen Jackson, who was waived before the start of the season. The Suns traded their first-round pick to the Cleveland Cavaliers in 1995 when they dealt Dan Majerle and Antonio Lang for John "Hot Rod" Williams.

Roster

Roster Notes
 Center Loren Meyer missed the entire season due to a spine injury.
 Center Mike Brown did not play in any regular season games with the Suns this season, due to previously playing in Italy. However, he was re-signed by the team on April 18, just one day before the final day of the regular season, and only played in one playoff game.

Salaries

Regular season

Standings

Record vs. opponents

Playoffs
Even with a 56–26 record, the Suns were the fourth seed in the West heading into the Playoffs. They would face the fifth-seeded San Antonio Spurs, headlined by star center David Robinson and Rookie of the Year forward Tim Duncan. Duncan led the Spurs to a game one upset in Phoenix, scoring 28 second-half points in a 102–96 victory. The Suns recovered to win game two 108–101. Antonio McDyess led the Suns with 21 points and 11 rebounds, while holding Duncan to 16 points with six turnovers. On the night he received the Rookie of the Year Award, Duncan again led the Spurs with 22 points, 14 rebounds and 3 blocks. Despite 26 points and 17 rebounds from McDyess, the Suns fell 88–100 and into a 1–2 series hole. The Spurs would clinch the series 3–1 in San Antonio, behind 30 points from Avery Johnson, 21 rebounds from Robinson, and 6 blocks from Duncan. McDyess pulled down 19 rebounds for the Suns, but shot only 5 of 14 from the field, while Kevin Johnson led the team with 18 points.

Game log

|- align="center" bgcolor="#ffcccc"
| 1
| April 23
| San Antonio
| L 96–102
| Kevin Johnson (18)
| George McCloud (9)
| Jason Kidd (11)
| America West Arena19,023
| 0–1
|- align="center" bgcolor="#ccffcc"
| 2
| April 25
| San Antonio
| W 108–101
| George McCloud (22)
| Antonio McDyess (11)
| Jason Kidd (10)
| America West Arena19,023
| 1–1
|- align="center" bgcolor="#ffcccc"
| 3
| April 27
| @ San Antonio
| L 88–100
| Antonio McDyess (26)
| Antonio McDyess (17)
| Johnson, Kidd (6)
| Alamodome20,486
| 1–2
|- align="center" bgcolor="#ffcccc"
| 4
| April 29
| @ San Antonio
| L 80–99
| Kevin Johnson (18)
| Antonio McDyess (19)
| Steve Nash (5)
| Alamodome27,528
| 1–3
|-

Awards and honors

Week/Month
 Jason Kidd was named Player of the Week for games played March 8 through March 14.
 Jason Kidd was named Player of the Week for games played April 12 through April 18.

All-Star
 Jason Kidd was selected as a reserve for the Western Conference in the All-Star Game. It was his second All-Star selection. Kidd finished fifth in voting among Western Conference guards with 305,834 votes.

Season
 Danny Manning was awarded the Sixth Man of the Year Award.
 Jason Kidd finished 13th in MVP voting.

Injuries/Missed games
 10/28/97: George McCloud: Deep knee bruise; did not play
 10/30/97: Loren Meyer: Lumbar spine surgery; placed on injured reserve for season
 10/30/97: Tom Chambers; Strained lower back; placed on injured list until November 21
 10/31/97: George McCloud: Concussion; did not play
 11/20/97: Horacio Llamas: Strained lower back; placed on injured list until January 30
 12/02/97: Kevin Johnson: Right knee tendinitis; out until December 11
 12/09/97: George McCloud: Flu; did not play
 12/09/97: Rex Chapman: Strained left hamstring; out until December 16
 12/11/97: Kevin Johnson: Right knee tendinitis; placed on injured list until January 31
 12/26/97: George McCloud: Thigh bruise; did not play
 12/26/97: Brooks Thompson: Ill; did not play
 12/29/97: Danny Manning: Abdominal strain; out until January 12
 01/04/98: Jason Kidd: Sprained right ankle; left game
 01/18/98: Hot Rod Williams; Flu, did not play
 01/30/98: Cedric Ceballos: Strained right calf; placed on injured list until February 12
 02/12/98: Horacio Llamas: Bruised left heel; placed on injured list until April 9
 02/17/98: Rex Chapman: Sprained left ankle; did not play
 02/22/98: Steve Nash: Did not play
 03/05/98: Rex Chapman: Sore right foot; out until March 13
 03/09/98: Antonio McDyess: Suspended one game for fighting Hakeem Olajuwon on March 7; did not play
 03/13/98: Mark Bryant: Flu; out until March 17
 03/25/98: Rex Chapman: Pulled right groin; out until April 4
 04/06/98: Steve Nash: Did not play
 04/09/98: Danny Manning: Injured right ACL; placed on injured list, out for season
 04/18/98: Rex Chapman: Aggravated left hamstring; placed on injured reserve until April 23
 04/23/98: Rex Chapman: Aggravated left hamstring; did not play
 04/29/98: Rex Chapman: Aggravated left hamstring; did not play

Player statistics

Season

* – Stats with the Suns.
† – Minimum 300 field goals made.
^ – Minimum 55 three-pointers made.

Playoffs

† – Minimum 20 field goals made.
^ – Minimum 10 free throws made.

Transactions

Trades

Free agents

Additions

Subtractions

Player Transactions Citation:

References

External links
 Pacific Division standings on Basketball Reference

Phoenix Suns seasons